Alexis Exequiel Eberhardt (born 2 March 1999) is an Argentine sports shooter. He competed in the men's 10 metre air rifle event at the 2020 Summer Olympics.

References

External links

1999 births
Living people
Argentine male sport shooters
Olympic shooters of Argentina
Shooters at the 2020 Summer Olympics
Sportspeople from Santa Fe, Argentina